God Is Able is the twentieth album in the live contemporary worship series by Hillsong Church. It was recorded at the Sydney Entertainment Centre in Australia by Reuben Morgan, Darlene Zschech and the Hillsong Worship Team on 7 November 2010. The songwriters include Reuben Morgan, Ben Fielding and Dylan Thomas, Darlene Zschech, Joel Houston, Harrison Wood, Jill McCloghry, Sam Knock, Joel Davies, Jason Ingram and Chris Tomlin. God Is Able debuted at number three on the ARIA Albums Chart. It was nominated at the 43rd GMA Dove Awards for Inspirational Album of the Year. The DVD was recognized at the 2012 ARIA No.1 Chart Awards for spending one week at number one on the Australian chart.

Track listing 

(* = Tracks only on deluxe album)

DVD/Blu-Ray
 "Rise"
 "The Difference"
 "With Us"
 "Unending Love"
 "Alive In Us"
 "Narrow Road"
 "My Heart Is Overwhelmed"
 "Cry Of The Broken"
 "Awakening"
 "God In Everything"
 "You Are More"
 "The Lost Are Found"
 "God Is Able"
 "Go"
 "Yours Forever"

Bonus features

Acoustic bonus songs
 "God Is Able"
 "The Lost Are Found"
 "My Heart Is Overwhelmed"

Songwriter interviews
 "Rise" - Joel Houston
 "With Us" - Reuben Morgan
 "The Lost Are Found" - Ben Fielding
 "God Is Able" - Reuben Morgan and Ben Fielding
 "The Difference" - Ben Fielding
 "Alive in Us" - Reuben Morgan
 "Cry of the Broken" - Darlene Zschech
 "Awakening" - Reuben Morgan

Acoustic worktapes
 "Rise"
 "With Us"
 "Unending Love"
 "The Lost Are Found"
 "God Is Able"'
 "The Difference"
 "Alive in Us"
 "You Are More"
 "Narrow Road"
 "My Heart Is Overwhelmed"
 "Cry of the Broken"

Personnel 

 Darlene Zschech – senior worship leader, senior lead vocal, songwriter
 Reuben Morgan – worship pastor, senior worship leader, songwriter, acoustic guitar
 Joel Houston – worship leader, backing vocal, songwriter, creative director, acoustic guitar, electric guitar
 Ben Fielding – worship leader, backing vocal, songwriter, electric guitar
 Jad Gillies – worship leader, backing vocal, acoustic guitar
 Annie Garratt – worship leader, backing vocal
 Jonathan Douglass (JD) – worship leader, backing vocal
 Dave Ware – worship leader, backing vocal
 Jill McCloghry – worship leader, songwriter
 Matt Crocker – worship leader (DVD only)
 Chantel Norman – worship leader
 Sam Knock – frontline singer
 Eric Liljero – frontline singer, keyboard
 Sheila Mpofu – frontline singer
 Dean Ussher - frontline singer
 Peter Wilson - frontline singer, acoustic guitar

Charts and certifications

Weekly charts

Year-end charts

Certifications

Extended play 

God Is Able was also issued as a five-track digital EP by Hillsong Music on 26 March 2012, after the album.

The EP is available on all digital formats, in all digital stores, and contains four songs and one talk by Hillsong Church's Brian Houston. The songs are studio versions for "God Is Able" and "With Us" with different effects and mixes. The Amazon version includes the live videos for "With Us" and "God Is Able"

Louder Than the Music rated the album four out of five stars, writing that "This EP is a great and a clear indication of how the whole live album will sound. Clearly the album will sound like a classic Hillsong album. Nothing wrong with that!"

EP track listing

References

2011 live albums
2011 video albums
Hillsong Music live albums
Hillsong Music video albums
Live video albums